Awad Saleh Ahmed (born 22 March 1969) is a Yemeni former middle-distance running athlete. He represented North Yemen at the 1988 Summer Olympic Games in the men's 1500 metres and finished fourteenth in his heat, failing to advance.

References

External links
 

1969 births
Living people
Yemeni male middle-distance runners
Olympic athletes of North Yemen
Athletes (track and field) at the 1988 Summer Olympics